Porokhovye Municipal Okrug is a municipal okrug in Krasnogvardeysky District, one of the eighty-one low-level municipal divisions  of the federal city of St. Petersburg, Russia. As of the 2010 Census, its population was 129,651, up from 123,583 recorded during the 2002 Census.

References

Notes

Sources

Krasnogvardeysky District, Saint Petersburg